Compression vest may refer to:
Compression garments, tight clothes used in sports or for medical purposes
Weighted vests for children, items used in treating children's developmental disorders